Senmonorom is the capital of the province of Mondulkiri, Cambodia. It is the only major town in the province. The town has over 10,000 inhabitants, and is often compared to frontier towns in the old American west.

Senmonorom (and the Mondulkiri province in general) is inhabited by the indigenous Bunong people. Bunong tribesmen and tribeswomen are often seen walking along major highways. The town is popular with NGO workers, loggers, and tourists both from outside Cambodia and from Cambodia's capital Phnom Penh.

According to reports from Global Witness, the Mondulkiri province is facing a significant threat from illegal loggers attempting to exploit the area's virgin forests. Protected areas close to Sen Monorom include Keo Seima Wildlife Sanctuary, Phnom Prich Wildlife Sanctuary, and  Srepok Wildlife Sanctuary.

Due to rapid development, as well as mania caused by real estate speculation, land prices in Sen Monorom have boomed. Lots that cost $150 in 2008 went for three or four times as much two years later in 2010.

Doh Kromum Mountain (translated as "Virtuous Woman's Breast Mountain") is a breast-shaped hill located close to Senmonorom. Members of the Bunong ethnic group ascribe divine powers to the hill and every year hold festivals in the location.

References

External links

 

Provincial capitals in Cambodia
Towns in Cambodia
Populated places in Mondulkiri province